The men's pole vault event at the 1970 European Athletics Indoor Championships was held on 15 March in Vienna.

Results

References

Pole vault at the European Athletics Indoor Championships
Pole